These were the results of men's singles tournament of badminton at the 1996 Summer Olympics. The tournament was single-elimination. Matches consisted of three sets, with sets being to 15 for men's singles. The tournament was held at the Georgia State University Gymnasium.

Seeds
  (quarterfinals)
  (gold medalist)
  (silver medalist)
  (fourth place)
  (quarterfinals)
  (quarterfinals)
  (quarterfinals)
  (bronze medalist)

Draw

Finals

Section 1

Section 2

Section 3

Section 4

References

Sources
Olympic Games 1996 I-Tournament Software

Badminton at the 1996 Summer Olympics
Men's events at the 1996 Summer Olympics